Javier Moreno Valera (born 10 September 1974) is a Spanish former footballer who played as a striker, and the current manager of CF Badalona.

Best known for his Alavés stint, he also had short spells in Italy and England, with little impact, amassing La Liga totals of 118 matches and 38 goals.

Club career

Early years and Alavés
Born in Silla, Valencian Community, Moreno made his professional debuts with FC Barcelona's B-team. After stints with lowly Córdoba CF and Yeclano CF he first joined Deportivo Alavés in January 1998, with the Basque team competing in Segunda División.

After being instrumental in CD Numancia's first ever La Liga promotion in 1999, Moreno returned to Alavés, shooting to prominence during his second spell after playing a pivotal role in their run to the 2001 UEFA Cup final. Along the way, defeated were the likes of Gaziantepspor, Lillestrøm SK, Rosenborg BK, Inter Milan, fellow league club Rayo Vallecano and 1. FC Kaiserslautern, before an eventual 4–5 extra time loss to Liverpool in the decisive match, where he scored two goals in three minutes (he also finished the league season with 22 successful strikes, good enough for third).

Abroad
Moreno's performances and goals during 2000–01 convinced Serie A's A.C. Milan to buy him, amid attention from Europe's other elite clubs. However, he struggled immensely in his sole campaign in Italy, returning to his country to join Atlético Madrid who had just returned to the top flight.

With goals hard to come by, a January 2004 loan move to Bolton Wanderers ensued but, after eight goalless appearances for The Trotters, including one in the final of the Football League Cup against Middlesbrough, Moreno found himself on the move again, this time to Real Zaragoza, where he appeared sparingly.

Return to Spain
Moreno refound his goalscoring form for old acquaintance Córdoba in July 2005, helping them to promotion to the second division in 2007 while finishing the Segunda División B top scorer with 24 goals in 32 appearances. After three years he was released, subsequently joining SE Eivissa-Ibiza in the third level; as he did not play the number of minutes he was expecting upon signing, he announced his retirement in December 2008.

Roughly one year after, Moreno returned to active aged 35, joining another club in division three, Lucena CF, and retiring for good at the season's end. On 23 September 2016, he was named AD Alcorcón B manager after replacing Óscar Mena.

International career
Moreno played five games for Spain in 2001, scoring once. His debut came on 28 February against England, in a friendly match played in Birmingham (0–3 loss) where he had a penalty saved by Nigel Martyn.

On 2 June, a mere seconds after having come on as a substitute for Luis Enrique, Moreno netted the nation's second goal in an eventual 4–1 home win over Bosnia and Herzegovina for the 2002 FIFA World Cup qualifiers.

Career statistics

International

Honours

Club
Alavés
Segunda División: 1997–98
UEFA Cup runner-up: 2000–01

Zaragoza
Supercopa de España: 2004

Individual
Segunda División B Top Scorer: 2006–07

References

External links
 
 
 
 

1974 births
Living people
People from Horta Sud
Sportspeople from the Province of Valencia
Spanish footballers
Footballers from the Valencian Community
Association football forwards
La Liga players
Segunda División players
Segunda División B players
Tercera División players
FC Barcelona C players
FC Barcelona Atlètic players
Córdoba CF players
Yeclano CF players
Deportivo Alavés players
CD Numancia players
Atlético Madrid footballers
Real Zaragoza players
Lucena CF players
Serie A players
A.C. Milan players
Premier League players
Bolton Wanderers F.C. players
Spain youth international footballers
Spain international footballers
Spanish expatriate footballers
Expatriate footballers in Italy
Expatriate footballers in England
Spanish expatriate sportspeople in Italy
Spanish expatriate sportspeople in England
Spanish football managers